Katoch is a Chandravanshi Rajput clan. Their traditional area of residence was in the Trigarta Kingdom, based at Jalandhar and at Kangra Fort in the Indian state of Himachal Pradesh. They descent from the Trigarta dynasty mentioned in the Mahabharata. Famous subclans came into existence from Katoch Rajputs are Dadwal Dynasty, Guleria Dynasty, Sibaia Dynasty, Chib Dynasty, Jaswal Dynasty.

Etymology 
There are two possible origins for the word Katoch. Members of the clan say it comes from the words Kat (army) and uch (upper class) but other sources say that it comes from kot (fort). The Kangra fort was known as Nagarkot or Kot Kangra, and since the administrators/rulers resided within that particular kot they were vernacularly called "Kot'ch" or कोटच, which means those within the fort. This over time became Katoch.

History 

The main branch of the Katoch clan were the rulers of the Kangra State, which was, by some accounts, the most prominent kingdom between the Ravi and Sutlej in the pre-modern period.
The Kangra State was also known as Trigadh, a name derived from the ancient Trigarta Kingdom mentioned in the Mahabharata. The tradition holds that the Katoch were the rulers of Kangra from the times of Mahabharata till the pre-independence era.

In the pre-modern period, the hill states of the modern Himachal Pradesh are said to have constantly warred with each other, despite relations of kinship and intermarriage. In 1333, under the reign of Raja Prithvi Chand, Mohammad Bin Tughlaq attacked Kangra with 100,000 men. Only 10 of them returned to Delhi and were executed by the emperor.  Then they were brought under the Mughal suzerainty by the emperor Akbar. The Mughal control was limited, however. The rulers of the states retained a fair degree of independence. Emperor Jahangir captured the Kangra fort in 1610, annexing the surrounding area and reducing the Katoch rajas to the status of vassals.

After the decline of the Mughal power, Raja Ghamand Chand (r. 1751–1774) recovered most of the territory earlier ceded to the Mughals. Raja Sansar Chand (r. 1775–1823) established the supremacy of Kangra over all the surrounding hill states. During his reign, Kangra became a major centre for the arts and several palaces were built.

In the year 1805, the neighbouring hill states rebelled, with the aid of the Gurkha army. Raja Sansar Chand was forced to seek the help of Maharaja Ranjit Singh of Lahore. The Gurkha army was expelled but Ranjit Singh also annexed the most fertile part of the Kangra valley, reducing the Katochs of Kangra as well as the neighbouring rajas to the status of vassals. After the First Anglo-Sikh War of 1846, the whole area was ceded to the British East India Company, eventually integrated into the Punjab province. The Katochs and the surrounding hill rajas were assigned small jagirs over which they had the rights of revenue and magisterial authority.

Clans and surnames 
The Katoch clan one of the 14 ruling clans of the Himachal Pradesh and Jammu region in the medieval times.

Katochs suffixed 'Chandra' to their names until the rise of the Sikh dynasty in Punjab, after which some clan members started suffixing 'Singh' also. However, most clan members today, including in the sub-clans, suffix Chand.

Until the reforms of 1930s, the Katoch women were only married westward, generally to the Pathania and Jamwal/Jamuwal men. The higher the sub-clan rated its own status, the farther away towards the west they tended to marry.

Regions ruled by the clan 

In past centuries, the clan and its branches ruled several princely states in the region of Trigarta. Trigarta refers to the land between three rivers, namely, Beas, Sutlej, and Ravi. However, the clan lost lands and by the 17th century had been reduced to a small hill state. The originator of the clan was Rajanaka Bhumi Chand. Their rulers include Sansar Chand II and Rajanaka Bhumi Chand, the latter being the founder of the Jwalamukhi temple in Himachal Pradesh.

Notes

References 

Rajput clans of Himachal Pradesh
History of Himachal Pradesh